Ischnodemus is a genus in the true bug family Blissidae. The review by Slater (1979) listed 95 species. The genus is found in all major zoogeographic regions, being most abundant on various species of Gramineae. The bodies of the adults are moderately to very elongated.

List of species

References

Blissidae